Alsodeiopsis Oliver is a genus of plants in the family Icacinaceae native to tropical Africa. There are about 11 species. Seventeen species names have been published in Alsodeiopsis, but many of these are synonyms. The type species, Alsodeiopsis mannii was named by Daniel Oliver in 1869.

Alsodeiopsis zenkeri is a rheophyte.

Species 

 Alsodeiopsis chippii Hutch., Accepted 
 Alsodeiopsis chippii subsp. rubra (Engl.) Govaerts, Accepted  
 Alsodeiopsis chippii subsp. villosa (Keay) Govaerts , Accepted 
 Alsodeiopsis mannii Oliv., Accepted
 Alsodeiopsis poggei Engl., Accepted
 Alsodeiopsis rowlandii Engl., Accepted
 Alsodeiopsis schumannii (Engl.) Engl., Accepted
 Alsodeiopsis staudtii Engl., Accepted
 Alsodeiopsis tessmannii Engl., Accepted
 Alsodeiopsis zenkeri Engl., Accepted
 Alsodeiopsis laurentii De Wild., Unresolved 	
 Alsodeiopsis weissenborriana Bramw. & Schumann, Unresolved
Synonyms:
 Alsodeiopsis bequaertii De Wild. = Alsodeiopsis rowlandii Engl.
 Alsodeiopsis glaberrima Engl. ex Hutch. & Dalziel = Olax gambecola Baill.
 Alsodeiopsis holstii Engl. = Leptaulus holstii (Engl.) Engl.
 Alsodeiopsis oblongifolia Engl. = Desmostachys oblongifolius (Engl.) Villiers
 Alsodeiopsis rubra Engl. = Alsodeiopsis chippii subsp. rubra (Engl.) Govaerts
 Alsodeiopsis villosa Keay = Alsodeiopsis chippii subsp. villosa (Keay) Govaerts
 Alsodeiopsis weissenborniana J.Braun & K.Schum. = Alsodeiopsis mannii Oliv.

References

External links
 Alsodeiopsis at IPNI

 
Taxonomy articles created by Polbot
Asterid genera
Taxa named by Daniel Oliver